The 2018 FIBA 3x3 Africa Cup was the second edition of the African 3x3 basketball event which was held between 9 and 11 November 2018 in Lomé, Togo. This event was staged in the covered outdoor venue of the Stade Omnisport Eyadema de Lomé. All African National Federations were invited to register a team for this event. Teams competed in two qualifiers in Benin and Madagascar to qualify for the event.

Qualification
The teams participating in this event were selected by two qualifying tournaments: one in Madagascar, and the other in Benin. Madagascar Qualifier took place on July 28-29 in Antananarivo, Madagascar, and Benin Qualifier took place in Cotonou, Benin on August 16-17. Four men's teams and three women's teams qualified in the Madagascar Qualifier and seven men's teams and eight women's team qualified through Benin Qualifier.

Participating teams

Men's

Women's

Men's tournament

Pool stage

Pool A

Pool B

Pool C

Pool D

Knockout stage 
All times are local.

Final standings

Women's tournament

Pool stage

Pool A

Pool B

Pool C

Pool D

Knockout stage 
All times are local.

Final standings

Shoot-Out Contest

Format
One player from each men's and women's team participated. In the qualifiers, players throw ten shots from the top of the arc. Two male and two female players who score the most points are qualified for the final. In the final, each player try 18 shots from four locations: five from the top of the arc, ten from the left and right wings, and three from the 3x3 logo. Shots from the 3x3 logo is given two points while the others are worth one.

Results
N'Faly Kanoute of Mali won gold and Sara Ageno of Uganda won silver.

References

External links
 Official website

2018 in 3x3 basketball
November 2018 sports events in Africa